Nir Berkovic (born 16 November 1982) is an Israeli former football player and currently the head coach of Ironi Kiryat Shmona. He is the younger brother of former Manchester City player Eyal Berkovic.

Berkovic born in Regba, Israel, and when he was 2 years old his family moved to the city of Nahariya. Started his career with Maccabi Haifa. At age 16, following disputes at Haifa, he was signed on a two-year contract as a youth player for English club Arsenal in December 1998. He spent four months at Arsenal, but could not obtain a work permit in England.

External links
Stats at IFA

References

1982 births
Living people
Israeli Jews
Israeli footballers
People from Regba
Footballers from Nahariya
Maccabi Haifa F.C. players
Hapoel Rishon LeZion F.C. players
Hapoel Haifa F.C. players
Maccabi Ahi Nazareth F.C. players
Hapoel Ra'anana A.F.C. players
Maccabi Netanya F.C. players
Hapoel Rishon LeZion F.C. managers
Hapoel Ramat Gan F.C. managers
Bnei Yehuda Tel Aviv F.C. managers
Sektzia Ness Ziona F.C. managers
Hapoel Ironi Kiryat Shmona F.C. managers
Israeli people of Romanian-Jewish descent
Association football midfielders
Israeli football managers